The 2021 Cork Premier Intermediate Football Championship was the 16th staging of the Cork Premier Intermediate Football Championship since its establishment by the Cork County Board in 2006. The draw for the group stage placings took place on 29 April 2021. The championship began on 4 September 2021 and ended on 5 December 2021.

The final, a Duhallow derby, was played on 5 December 2021 at Páirc Uí Chaoimh in Cork, between Newmarket and Kanturk, in what was their first ever meeting in a final. Newmarket won the match by 0-12 to 0-11 to claim their second championship title overall and their first title in 10 years.

Newmarket's Conor O'Keeffe was the championship's top scorer with 0-32.

Team changes

To Championship

Promoted from the Cork Intermediate A Football Championship
 Rockchapel

Relegated from the Cork Senior A Football Championship
 St. Nicholas'

From Championship

Promoted to the Cork Senior A Football Championship
 Knocknagree

Relegated to the Cork Intermediate A Football Championship
 Gabriel Rangers

Results

Group A

Table

Results

Group B

Table

Results

Group C

Table

Results

Relegation stage

Playoff

Knockout stage

Quarter-finals

Semi-finals

Final

Championship statistics

Top scorers

Overall

In a single game

References

External links
 Cork GAA website

Cork Premier Intermediate Football Championship